Victoria Dam may refer to:
 Victoria Dam (Cape Town)
 Victoria Dam (Sri Lanka), the largest hydroelectric dam in Sri Lanka
 Victoria Dam (Western Australia), a dam in Australia